Andriy Oleksandrovych Makarenko (born 13 December 1996) is a Ukrainian professional footballer who plays as a midfielder for FC Chernihiv in the Ukrainian First League.

Early career
Makarenko started his career in 2015 with Yunist Chernihiv before moving to Polissya Dobryanka in 2016.

Career

FC Chernihiv
In 2017 he moved to YSB Chernihiv, where he played for two season. In the meantime, the club changed its name to FC Chernihiv and was promoted to the Ukrainian Second League. On 6 September 2020, he made his debut with the club against Rubikon Kyiv in the 2020–21 Ukrainian Second League season.

Career statistics

Club

References

External links
 Andriy Makarenko at FC Chernihiv 
 
 

1996 births
Living people
Footballers from Chernihiv
Association football defenders
FC Yunist Chernihiv players
FC Chernihiv players
Ukrainian footballers
Ukrainian Second League players
Ukrainian First League players